Gary Michael Carter Jr. (born November 1974) is an American attorney and politician serving as the Democratic member of the Louisiana House of Representatives for the 102nd district, which encompasses the Algiers neighborhood.

Early life and education 
Carter was born in New Orleans. A graduate of Archbishop Shaw High School and Xavier University, Carter earned his J.D. degree from Tulane University Law School, all in New Orleans.

Career 
Carter is a partner at the firm, Kelly Hart & Pitre.

On January 11, 2016, he succeeded fellow Democrat Jeff Arnold in the Louisiana House of Representatives. Arnold was ineligible to seek a fourth four-year term in the legislative primary held on October 24, 2015.

In the primary, Carter polled 4,914 votes (57 percent) of the ballots cast against five fellow Democrats.

Carter said that as a state representative, he would emphasize an economic plan to establish more jobs and invest in education to "break the long term cycle of crime in our city."

Personal life 
He is a Roman Catholic. His uncle is Troy Carter.

References

1974 births
Living people
Politicians from New Orleans
Lawyers from New Orleans
Democratic Party members of the Louisiana House of Representatives
Archbishop Shaw High School alumni
Xavier University of Louisiana alumni
Tulane University Law School alumni
African-American state legislators in Louisiana
African-American Catholics
21st-century American politicians
Catholics from Louisiana
21st-century African-American politicians
20th-century African-American people